Igreja de Chelas is a church in Portugal. It is classified as a National Monument.

Roman Catholic churches in Lisbon
National monuments in Lisbon District